Ashish Gulhati (born 1973 in New Delhi, India) author, philosopher, notable for being one of India's first online activists and open source hackers.

Open source
As one of India's original hackers, Ashish has worked to raise awareness about FOSS in India. In 1993 he co-founded The X Group, the first company to offer professional commercial support for open-source software in India, with Raj Mathur. 

He is an open source developer and the author of several extensions to the Perl programming language, including PerlVision, Crypt::GPG, Crypt::Schnorr::AuthSign, Persistence::Database::SQL and Persistence::Object::Postgres.

Articles
His articles and columns in PCQuest and Dataquest magazines in 1993 and 1994 were among the first in the mainstream Indian computing press to inform thousands of readers about alternative operating systems, Unix, Linux, open-source software, Email, the Internet and the World Wide Web, years before Internet access was commercially available in India. These early articles  formed an important part of the PCQuest Linux Initiative that resulted in close to a million Linux CD-ROMs being distributed.

BBS
In pre-Internet India, Ashish created and operated the Primal Scream Bulletin Board System, and created the country's first inter-city Fidonet echo. Soon after the launch of Internet services in India, Ashish co-founded Sense/NET, a very popular ISP, with Vipul Ved Prakash. Prakash as of 2018 serves as a Director of Engineering at Apple.

Web development
In 1997 Ashish created the award-winning website for Connect Magazine, the first Indian magazine with an online edition. 

In 1998, he created the website and online publishing engine for The American Reporter, the world's first and oldest original daily Internet newspaper, and winner of the landmark First Amendment case, Shea v Reno.

Security and privacy
In 1999, he was involved with Laissez Faire City, where he developed Laissez Faire City's OpenPGP compatible messaging engine, and also deployed secure wireless links for Laissez-Faire City's consulate in Costa Rica.

Since 2000, he has been actively involved in various security and privacy-related efforts

References 

 India Today
 The Economic Times
 Wired Magazine
 The American Reporter
 Connect Magazine
 Express Computer India
 PCQuest Aug '93 Unix Article
 PCQuest Sep '93 Linux Article

External links
 https://web.archive.org/web/20070409091054/http://netropolis.org/hash/ - Blog
 https://web.archive.org/web/20110721181526/http://thefree.in/ - Forum for Rights to Electronic Expression

1973 births
Living people
People from New Delhi
Indian technology writers